Count John I of Rietberg ( – 1516) was Count of Rietberg from 1472 until his death.  He was the eldest son of Count Conrad V and his wife Jacoba of Neuenahr.  When his father died in 1472, he inherited the County of Rietberg.

During a traditional boundary inspection tour on 1 May 1474, he shared a keg of beer with the citizens of Rietberg.  In 1477, he promised the mayor and city council of Rietberg to restore their ancient rights and privileges and grant them the same rights as the city of Lippstadt.

Also in 1477, John's brother Conrad travelled to Rome with John of Roden and his wife Lucke.  They raised money for this journey by mortgaging Aldehof manor in Bokel.

On 24 April 1481, John I and his wife Margaret joined Marienfeld Abbey, which was led by abbot John V Wineken.  On 13 May 1481, John donated an altar in the abbey for the souls of his parents and siblings.  As payment, he transferred the Horntemannsgut in Gütersloh parish, however, with an option to buy it back for 200 Rhenish guilders.  He also donated an altar to the castle chapel in Rietberg.

Marriage and issue 
Before 1475, he married Margaret of Lippe.  She bore him nine children:

 Otto III (d. 18 December 1535), Count of Rietberg 1516–1535
 Bernard (d. 15 October 1501), Dean of Osnabrück and Cologne
 Conrad (d. 1500), a canon of Cologne
 John (d. 1530), a canon of Cologne
 Simon, mentioned in documents 1486–1494
 Elisabeth (d. July 1512), married on 27 July 1497 Count Edzard I of East Frisia
 Emgard (d. after 1535), married before 1499 to Count Otto IX of Tecklenburg
 Margaret, mentioned in 1491
 Frederick (d. 1539), a canon of Cologne

Counts of Rietberg
1450 births
1516 deaths
15th-century German people